Rama Varma VIII (died 16 August 1790) was an Indian monarch who ruled the Kingdom of Cochin from 1775 until his death in 1790.

Reign 
Rama Varma VIII was the younger brother of Kerala Varma II and succeeded the latter to the throne on his death in 1775. Rama Varma VIII scarcely commanded any authority during his reign as the kingdom was largely a puppet state under the suzerainty of Hyder Ali of Mysore. During Rama Varma's reign, the Muslim general Sardar Khan captured the city of Cochin and established his residence at Thrissur.

Rama Varma VIII succumbed to an epidemic of small pox on 16 August 1790 and was succeeded to the throne by his nephew Rama Varma IX.

References 
 
 

1790 deaths
Rulers of Cochin
Year of birth unknown